Igor Pak (born 1971, Moscow, Soviet Union) is a professor of mathematics at the University of California, Los Angeles, working in combinatorics and discrete probability.  He formerly taught at the Massachusetts Institute of Technology and the University of Minnesota, and he is best known for his bijective proof of the hook-length formula for the number of Young tableaux, and his work on random walks. He was a keynote speaker alongside George Andrews and Doron Zeilberger at the 2006 Harvey Mudd College Mathematics Conference on Enumerative Combinatorics.

Pak is an Associate Editor for the journal Discrete Mathematics. He gave a Fejes Tóth Lecture at the University of Calgary in February 2009.

In 2018, he was an invited speaker at the International Congress of Mathematicians in Rio de Janeiro.

Background
Pak went to Moscow High School № 57.  After graduating, he worked for a year at Bank Menatep.

He did his undergraduate studies at Moscow State University.  He was a PhD student of Persi Diaconis at Harvard University, where he received a doctorate in Mathematics in 1997, with a thesis titled Random Walks on Groups: Strong Uniform Time Approach.  Afterwards, he worked with László Lovász as a postdoc at Yale University.  He was a fellow at the Mathematical Sciences Research Institute and a long-term visitor at the Hebrew University of Jerusalem.

References

External links
Personal site.
List of published papers, with abstracts.
MIT Mathematics Department website.
MathSciNet: "Items authored by Pak, Igor."
DBLP: Igor Pak.

1971 births
20th-century American mathematicians
21st-century American mathematicians
Combinatorialists
Harvard University alumni
Living people
Massachusetts Institute of Technology School of Science faculty
Moscow State University alumni
Mathematicians from Moscow
Russian emigrants to the United States
University of Minnesota faculty
University of California, Los Angeles faculty